Bits was a British entertainment television series that aired on Channel 4 from 4 June 1999 to 6 April 2001, with both late night and edited morning versions of the show, the show reviewed computer games, testing the (then) latest games releases across multiple platforms.

Five series were produced and, uniquely at the time for a show about computer games, had an all female presentation team.

There were also a number of special episodes, notably a three-parter in early 2000 titled the Bits 'Super Console Tour' which primarily featured the girls challenging various "pro" gamers in 1v1 battles around the UK in each episode (London, Blackpool, and one other location), as well as their usual sketches and short reviews and newsclips. The games chosen were usually new releases on various consoles, one of which was FantaVision on the newly launched PlayStation 2, at which Emily Booth was defeated by Alek Hayes, who was employed at the time at BarrysWorld.

Transmissions

External links

1999 British television series debuts
2001 British television series endings
Channel 4 original programming
Television shows about video games
Video gaming in the United Kingdom